Bouthillier is a surname, and may refer to;

 Armand Jean le Bouthillier de Rancé (1626-1700), French Trappist monk
 Claude Bouthillier (1581-1652), French statesman and diplomat
 Flavien-Guillaume Bouthillier (1844-1907), Quebec lawyer and politician 
 Guy Bouthillier (born 1939), Canadian academic
 John Le Bouthillier (1797-1872), Quebec businessman
 Léon Bouthillier, comte de Chavigny (1844-1907), French statesman
 Louis-Tancrède Bouthillier (1796-1881), Canadian merchant
 Marie-Claude Bouthillier (born 1960), Canadian artist 
 Victor Le Bouthillier (1590-1670), French politician and clergyman
 Wilfred Le Bouthillier (born 1978), Canadian singer
 Yves Bouthillier (1901-1977), French politician

French-language surnames